The voters of the U.S. state of Ohio elect a governor for a four-year term. There is a term limit of two consecutive terms as governor. Bold type indicates victor. Italic type indicates incumbent. Starting in 1978, the nominees for governor and lieutenant governor ran on a joint ticket.

Primaries

Democratic Party

Republican Party

General elections

Notes

References

 
Elections
Quadrennial elections